Family Law in Partnership is a specialist family law firm advising on the full range of family law issues including divorce and separation (financial and children related issues), never married family separations, same sex marriage and civil partnerships, and pre and post nuptial agreements. The firm regularly deals with cross border divorce cases and jurisdiction issues, and has a strong international practice.
 
Family Law in Partnership was named Best Law Firm 2019 & 2020 by The Times, the firm is ranked as a top tier law firm for both family law and family mediation by Legal 500 2020, and the firm was named a leader for client service by Legal Business (April 2020).

History 
Family Law in Partnership was established in 1995.  The firm was the first law firm to bring together lawyers, mediators and family counsellors working together to resolve clients' relationship issues.

Practice 
The firm advises on all aspects of family law with particular emphasis on the resolution of issues arising from divorce and separation. Specialists regularly advise on cases involving financial complexity including those with an international element, hidden assets, family companies and trust structures. The firm advises and represents parents on issues concerning their children, particularly removal from the jurisdiction. Moreover, it works with cohabitants and civil partners on issues such as relationship and prenuptial agreements and the registration of civil partnerships. Two directors and two consultants are qualified family arbitrators. Mediation and counselling services are available to all clients.

The firm was instrumental in introducing the practice of collaborative family law to Europe and its lawyers are widely recognised as leaders in the field of collaborative law. Consultant Gillian Bishop wrote the first practical handbook for clients divorcing collaboratively, “A Client’s Guide to Collaborative Divorce – Putting Your Family First”.

See also 
 English Law Commission

Notes

References 
Researching Reform - Westminster Debate: Supporting Families after the Riots and the Role of Family Law

External links 
Official Website 
Family Mediators & Solicitors
FLiP's Profile on Legal 500 UK 2020
FLiP's profile on Chambers & Partners UK Guide 2020
FLiP's profile on Chambers & Partners High Net Worth Guide 2020

Law firms of the United Kingdom
Companies based in the City of Westminster